Bet on Your Baby is an American game show that is hosted by Melissa Peterman. The series premiered on ABC on April 13, 2013, with two back-to-back episodes. Each episode features five families with toddlers between the ages of two to three-and-a-half years old, who play to see how well they can guess their child's next move in order to win money toward their college fund.

On January 28, 2014, Bet on Your Baby was renewed for an eight episode second season. Season 2 premiered on May 31, 2014. The show did not make ABC's Summer 2015 schedule.

International versions

References

External links
 at the Wayback Machine

2010s American game shows
2013 American television series debuts
American Broadcasting Company original programming
English-language television shows
ABS-CBN original programming
2014 American television series endings